Sağkol is a village in the Güçlükonak District of Şırnak Province in Turkey. The settlement is populated by Kurds of the Harunan tribe and had a population of 98 in 2021.

References 

Villages in Güçlükonak District
Kurdish settlements in Şırnak Province